Wilberto Cosme Mosquera (born July 22, 1984) is a Colombian professional footballer who plays for Mexican side Puebla F.C. as a striker.

External links
 
 
 Wilberto Cosme at playmakerstats.com (English version of ogol.com.br)

1984 births
Living people
Colombian footballers
Bogotá FC footballers
Real Cartagena footballers
Atlético Huila footballers
América de Cali footballers
La Equidad footballers
Millonarios F.C. players
Querétaro F.C. footballers
Chiapas F.C. footballers
Club Puebla players
Real Garcilaso footballers
Deportivo Pasto footballers
Categoría Primera A players
Liga MX players
Peruvian Primera División players
Colombian expatriate footballers
Expatriate footballers in Mexico
Expatriate footballers in Peru
Colombian expatriate sportspeople in Mexico
Association football forwards
Sportspeople from Cauca Department